Holy Island is a populated island located within Lake Charlevoix in the U.S. state of Michigan.  The island is part of Eveline Township in Charlevoix County.

Geography

History
The island was first settled by Mormon leader James Strang in 1855 at a time when the lake was still referred to as Pine Lake.  He used the island for holding the Feast of First Fruits.  After he died in 1856, the island transitioned into a popular summer resort.

The island is accessible by a bridge from the mainland along Greenleaf Avenue. The first bridge was constructed as early as 1903 in another location but was moved to connect Holy Island in 1945.

References

Church of Jesus Christ of Latter Day Saints (Strangite)
Islands of Charlevoix County, Michigan